is a village located in Nagano Prefecture, Japan. , the village had an estimated population of 977, and a population density of 3.9 persons per km².

Geography
Ōshika is located mountainous southern of Nagano Prefecture, between the Ina Mountains and the Akaishi Mountains, with the Japan Median Tectonic Line passing through the southern portion of the village.

Surrounding municipalities
 Nagano Prefecture
 Ina
 Komagane
 Iida
 Iijima
 Nakagawa
 Matsukawa
 Toyooka
 Shizuoka Prefecture
 Aoi-ku, Shizuoka

Climate
The village has a climate characterized by hot and humid summers, and cold winters (Köppen climate classification Cfa).  The average annual temperature in Ōshika is 10.5 °C. The average annual rainfall is 1655 mm with September as the wettest month. The temperatures are highest on average in August, at around 22.8 °C, and lowest in January, at around -1.5 °C.

Demographics
Per Japanese census data, the population of Ōshika has declined by more than 80 percent from its peak around 1950.

History
The area of present-day Ōshika was part of ancient Shinano Province. During the Edo period, the area was part of the tenryō territories administered directly by the Tokugawa shogunate. The present village of Ōshika was established on April 1, 1889 with the establishment of the modern municipalities system.

Education
Ōshika has one public elementary school and one public middle school operated by the village government. The village does not have a high school.

Transportation

Railway
The village does not have any passenger railway service

Highway

References

External links

Official Website 

 
Villages in Nagano Prefecture